Henryk Leliwa-Roycewicz (30 July 1898 in Janopol, Ryki County – 18 June 1990 in Warsaw) was a Polish Major of the Cavalry and horse rider who competed in the 1936 Summer Olympics.

In 1936 he and his horse Arlekin III (translated as Harlequin III in English) won the silver medal as part of the Polish eventing team, after finishing 15th in the individual eventing competition.

Leliwa-Roycewicz was a career officer of the Cavalry of the Polish Army. He fought in the September Campaign of World War II. After Polish defeat he joined the Home Army and later commanded one of the battalions during the Warsaw Uprising. After the war he was a victim of a communist show trial, sentenced for 6 years as a political prisoner of the communist regime.

He was awarded the Virtuti Militari and the Order of Polonia Restituta. Leliwa-Roycewicz was buried at the Powązki Military Cemetery in Warsaw.

References

External links
profile 
dataOlympics profile

1898 births
1990 deaths
Polish male equestrians
Event riders
Olympic equestrians of Poland
Equestrians at the 1936 Summer Olympics
Olympic silver medalists for Poland
Olympic medalists in equestrian
People from Ryki County
Sportspeople from Lublin Voivodeship
People from Lublin Governorate
Medalists at the 1936 Summer Olympics
Polish Army officers
Polish military personnel of World War II
Home Army officers
Warsaw Uprising insurgents
Burials at Powązki Military Cemetery
Recipients of the Order of Polonia Restituta
Recipients of the Silver Cross of the Virtuti Militari
Recipients of the Gold Cross of the Virtuti Militari
20th-century Polish people